Masashige (written: 正成, 正重, 政重 or 政繁) is a masculine Japanese given name. Notable people with the name include:

 (1580–1652), Japanese samurai
 (1585–1662), Japanese daimyō
 (1545–1643), Japanese samurai
 (1294–1336), Japanese samurai

Japanese masculine given names